Sir Simon Michael Hornby    (29 December 1934 – 17 July 2010) was a British businessman. He was chairman of WHSmith, the British retail chain, the Royal Horticultural Society and the Design Council. He founded the National Literacy Trust.

Early life
Simon Michael Hornby was born on 29 December 1934 in London. He was the son of Michael Hornby and grandson of St John Hornby. He grew up on his father's estate at Pusey House in Berkshire (now Oxfordshire) and was educated at Eton College, New College, Oxford and Harvard Business School. He served in the Grenadier Guards as a 2nd Lieutenant from 1953-55.

Career
Hornby followed his father and grandfather on to the board of WHSmith, becoming Chairman in 1982. During his chairmanship the company acquired the Our Price records chain and the Paperchase stationery chain. They developed the Do It All DIY superstores and took a half-share in the Richard Branson created Virgin Megastores. Hornby also oversaw the acquisition of rival booksellers Waterstone's from former WHSmith manager, Tim Waterstone.

His hobby was gardening and he created gardens first at Lake House, close to Pusey, then at The Ham, his last home near Wantage. He wrote on gardening for The Tatler and was President of the Royal Horticultural Society from 1994 to 2001. He was chairman of the Design Council from 1986 to 1992.

Personal life
He married Sheran Cazalet, the sister of his friend, the high court judge Sir Edward Cazalet, and daughter of the Queen Mother's horse trainer Peter Cazalet. They had no children.

Honours
Hornby was knighted in the 1988 New Year Honours.

References

1934 births
2010 deaths
Simon
People from Vale of White Horse (district)
People educated at Eton College
Alumni of New College, Oxford
Harvard Business School alumni
Knights Bachelor
Cazalet family